Powell House, named after Elsie K. Powell Sr., is the Quaker conference and retreat center of the New York Yearly Meeting of the Religious Society of Friends, located in Old Chatham, New York.

Use 
Powell House is used primarily for religious conferences and similar gatherings of members and attenders of meetings belonging to New York Yearly Meeting. It is also used for meetings of Yearly Meeting committees or conferences sponsored by them. The programs include a wide variety of educational, inspirational, and organizational activities for youth and adults related to the religious, benevolent, and social concerns of the Religious Society of Friends. The facilities are available for use by affiliated Friends’ organizations and other religious or educational groups having interests compatible with those of Friends. Short-term sojourners are sometimes accommodated.

History 

In 1960, Elsie Powell donated residential property to New York Yearly Meeting.  The annual meeting decided to establish a retreat center on the property.

Powell House held a 40th anniversary celebration in 2000.

During 2008 and 2009 the Anna Curtis Center underwent renovations.  The renovation included several energy-saving improvements such as the installation of solar panels and a radiant floor heating system.  It made more space for conference activities and increased the sleeping capacity of the facility.  It also made the facility handicapped accessible.

Campus 
Powell House's campus now consists of Pitt Hall; the Anna Curtis Center, a director’s residence; a youth directors’ residence, and fifty-seven acres of land with a campground and two wildlife ponds.

Pitt Hall is where the majority of adult conferences are held.

The Anna Curtis Center, also known as the Youth Center, is where youth conferences are usually held.

Youth program 
The youth program has conferences designed for several age groups.  There are conferences for 4th and 5th graders, 6th through 8th, and 9th through 12th graders.  Most youth conferences run from Friday dinner to Sunday lunch and have around 40 attenders.

WinterSong and EarthSong are special youth conferences for which both buildings are required because there are nearly double the usual number of attendees. Earthsong celebrates the spring and the seniors who are graduating from the program.  Wintersong celebrates warmth, community, and light in winter.  Youth from 7th to 12th grades are invited to these conferences.

Activities 

Typical conferences consist of the following elements:
Session: A time when the whole group gathers for discussion, games, or other activities.
Small group discussions
Free time
Meals and snacks: The youth help with dishes, cooking, cleaning, and other tasks and learn a good work ethic.
Work projects: The attendees are asked to help with some project that needs doing on the campus.
Workshops: Attenders choose to attend a workshop.  Adults from the Quaker community are often asked to lead workshops for the youth.
Self space: A period in the middle of the conference set aside for relaxation and alone time.
Quiet time: Just before bed time the group gathers to here a story and say good night.

Leadership in the youth program 
At most youth conferences there are only two adult leaders (the directors) and one adult presence (AP).  Because most of the youth want to be there and enjoy the program immensely there is very little need for authoritative figures, however several Junior Councilors (JCs) are chosen for every 4th and 5th grade and 6th through 8th grade conference.

JCs are youth slightly older than the youth attending the conference, who also attend conferences themselves.  Once a year there is a JC training conference (JCT) during which attenders learn leadership and mediation skills.  JCs lead small group discussions, work projects, games, meal and snack crews, and workshops.  They are also expected to set an example for the other youth and help maintain the community's safety and order.

References 

Quakerism in New York (state)
Buildings and structures in Columbia County, New York